Hambidge is a surname. Notable people with the surname include:

Alice Hambidge (1869–1947, Australian artist
Clive M. Hambidge (1888–1950), Surveyor General of South Australia from 1937 to 1950
Douglas Hambidge (born 1927), Canadian Anglican bishop
Jay Hambidge (1867–1924), Canadian-born American artist
Joan Hambidge (born 1956), South African poet, literary theorist and academic

See also
Hambidge (disambiguation)
Hanbidge